Double Vision is a 1992 television film directed by Robert Knights. The film was based on the novel by Mary Higgins Clark.

Plot
The telepathy between identical twins: conventional Caroline lives with her father and is engaged; Lisa is hard-drinking, devil-may-care, and lives in London as a high-class call girl. Caroline has horrid dreams of Lisa's untimely demise, so she flies to London to help. To find out what befell Lisa, Caroline submerges herself in Lisa's dangerous milieu, seeking help from an East Indian cabdriver who loved Lisa, and continuing to have dreams and visions. Then, while staying in Lisa's flat, wearing Lisa's clothes, and avoiding her own fiancé, who has followed her over from the States, Caroline follows her instincts to confront what did happen in her sister's last minutes of life.

Cast
Kim Cattrall as Caroline/Lisa
Gale Hansen as Michael
Macha Méril as Mrs. Perfect
Naveen Andrews as Jimmy
Christopher Lee as Mr. Bernard
Shane Rimmer as Caroline and Lisa's father
Barbara Windsor as Snow Queen boss
Ciara Lavers as Young Caroline
Andrea Lavers as Young Lisa
Hakeem Kae-Kazim as Barman (as Hakeem Kae Kazim)

References

External links
 
 

1992 television films
1992 films
British drama films
British mystery thriller films
British thriller television films
Canadian thriller television films
French thriller films
German thriller films
1990s mystery thriller films
English-language Canadian films
English-language French films
English-language German films
Films based on American novels
Films based on mystery novels
Films based on thriller novels
Films directed by Robert Knights
1990s Canadian films
1990s British films
1990s French films
1990s German films